The following is the complete filmography of Canadian actor Leslie Nielsen.

Films

Television

Video 
 1980: Dive to the Edge of Creation (National Geographic Special)
 1993: Bad Golf Made Easier
 1994: Bad Golf My Way
 1997: Stupid Little Golf Video
 1997: National Geographic Video: The Savage Garden
 Nielsen also appeared in a promotional video for Layman Allen's mathematics game called Equations and in the Seaworld San Antonio Summer Nights 4-D show "Pirates 4-D".

References

External links
 
 

Canadian filmographies
Male actor filmographies